George Cecil Orlando Bridgeman, 4th Earl of Bradford JP DL (3 February 1845 – 2 January 1915), styled Viscount Newport from 1865 to 1898, was a British soldier and peer.

The elder son of the 3rd Earl of Bradford and the Hon. Selina Louisa Forester, Bridgeman was educated at Harrow School, and served in the 1st Life Guards and the Shropshire Yeomanry, reaching the rank of Captain. He succeeded his father in his titles on 9 March 1898.

Bridgeman was Member of Parliament (MP) for North Shropshire from 1867 to 1885. He was Deputy Lieutenant of Warwickshire and Shropshire, as well as Justice of Peace for Staffordshire, Warwickshire and Shropshire.

He died in London, and was buried in Weston Park, Staffordshire, on 6 January 1915.

Family
On 7 September 1869, the then-Viscount Newport, married his second cousin once-removed, Lady Ida Lumley (28 November 1848 – 22 August 1936), daughter of Richard Lumley, 9th Earl of Scarbrough (7 May 1813 – 5 December 1884), and Frederica Mary Adeliza Drummond (16 December 1826 – 2 April 1907) in Maltby, Yorkshire.  They had seven children:

Lady Beatrice Adine Bridgeman (2 December 1870 – 27 June 1952), married on 28 June 1894 to Colonel Rt. Hon. Ernest George Pretyman (13 November 1859 – 26 November 1931) and had issue.
Lady Margaret Alice Bridgeman (20 January 1872 – 7 August 1954), married John Montagu-Douglas-Scott, 7th Duke of Buccleuch, on 30 January 1893 and had issue, one such being Princess Alice, Duchess of Gloucester.
Orlando Bridgeman, 5th Earl of Bradford (6 October 1873 – 21 March 1957).
Lady Helena Mary Bridgeman (16 July 1875 – 27 August 1947), married Osbert Molyneux, 6th Earl of Sefton, on 8 January 1898 and had issue.
Lady Florence Sibell Bridgeman (24 March 1877 – 16 June 1936), married Ronald Collet Norman, son of Frederick Henry Norman, on 10 February 1904 and had issue.
Commander The Hon. Richard Orlando Beaconsfield Bridgeman (28 February 1879 – 9 January 1917), who was awarded the Distinguished Service Order and died in East Africa after the plane in which he was flying as observer, with Sqdn. Cdr. Edwin Rowland Moon as pilot, was forced to land with engine trouble. He was buried in Dar Es Salaam CWGC Cemetery.
Lieutenant-Colonel The Hon. Henry Bridgeman (15 August 1882 – 19 May 1972), married on 30 December 1930 to Joan Constable-Maxwell (22 March 1901 – 1991) and had issue.

The Countess of Bradford was a Lady of the Bedchamber to the Princess of Wales (later Queen Mary) from 1901.

Notes

References

External links

1845 births
1915 deaths
People educated at Harrow School
British Life Guards officers
Deputy Lieutenants of Warwickshire
Deputy Lieutenants of Shropshire
4
Bridgeman, George
Bridgeman, George
Bridgeman, George
Bridgeman, George
Bridgeman, George
Bridgeman, George
Shropshire Yeomanry officers
George